Janówek railway station is a railway station in Janówek, Nowy Dwór, Masovian, Poland. It is served by Koleje Mazowieckie.

References

External links

Railway stations in Warsaw